Kposowa is a royal family from Sierra Leone that is of Mende ethnicity. The family is in charge of the Bumpe–Gao Chiefdom located in Bumpe. Notable family members include:

Frank Kposowa, Sierra Leonean politician
Princess Esther Kposowa, founder of the Kposowa Foundation
Augustine Kposowa, American sociologist

Kposowa family
African royal families
Sierra Leonean families